KJCY is a Christian radio station licensed to St. Ansgar, Iowa, broadcasting on 95.5 MHz FM. KJCY serves the areas of Mason City, Iowa and Austin, Minnesota. The station is owned by Minn-Iowa Christian Broadcasting, Inc.

Translators

References

External links
KJCY's official website

JCY